Thomas Byström (November 27, 1893 – July 22, 1979) was a Swedish horse rider who competed in the 1932 Summer Olympics. In 1932 he won the silver medal as member of the Swedish dressage team after finishing fourth with his horse Gulliver in the individual dressage competition.

References

External links
 

1893 births
1979 deaths
Swedish dressage riders
Olympic equestrians of Sweden
Swedish male equestrians
Equestrians at the 1932 Summer Olympics
Olympic silver medalists for Sweden
Olympic medalists in equestrian
Medalists at the 1932 Summer Olympics
20th-century Swedish people